Amanda Karlene Asay (May 16, 1988 – January 7, 2022) was a Canadian baseball and ice hockey player.  She played on the Canada women's national baseball team from 2005 to 2021, and was its longest-serving member at the time of her death.  She batted and threw right-handed, and played at catcher, first base, and starting pitcher.

Asay joined the national team when she was 17 years old.  She played in the World Cup one year later, where she was named to the all-tournament team as first baseman and won the national team's Most Valuable Player (MVP) award.  She proceeded to compete in six more World Cup tournaments, earning two silver and two bronze medals in total.  She was also part of the roster which secured a silver medal at the 2015 Pan American Games.  At the 2016 World Cup, she played as a pitcher, won both her starts by pitching complete games, and was again bestowed the team MVP award.

Early life
Asay was born in Prince George, British Columbia, on May 16, 1988.  Her father, George, worked as a high school science teacher; her mother, Loris, was a nurse.  Asay began playing baseball when she was five.  She attended College Heights Secondary School in her hometown, where she graduated with honours.  She then studied at Brown University on an academic and hockey scholarship, graduating with a Bachelor of Science in 2010.  Subsequently, she completed postgraduate studies at the University of British Columbia under the supervision of Suzanne Simard, obtaining a Master of Science in 2013, and a Doctor of Philosophy in forestry in 2020.  Her research concentrated on kin selection and recognition in interior Douglas fir, as well as the involvement of mycorrhizal network in that interaction.

Playing career

NCAA
Asay competed in softball for Brown University from 2007 until her senior year in 2010, playing as first baseman, outfielder, and designated hitter. In her first season, she had the most runs batted in (RBIs) on the team with 16, to go along with 20 hits and 8 runs scored in 42 games played. She was limited to eight games the following year due to an injury that prematurely ended her season, but maintained a .435 batting average with 10 hits and six RBIs in those games. Her 2009 season was also cut short to six games because of another season-ending injury. She nonetheless had 10 hits, two home runs, six RBIs, and six runs scored in 13 at bats. She served as team captain during her senior year.

Asay also played on the Brown Bears women's ice hockey team. She missed only one game during her first season in 2006–07, in order to travel back home to receive the Canadian women's baseball player of the year award. During her second year, she played 19 games as defenceman and had nine shots.

Baseball
Asay joined the Canadian national team in 2005, when she was 17 years old.  One year later, she made her World Cup debut at the tournament in Taiwan in which the Canadians secured bronze.  Asay was employed as a backup at her natural position of catcher, with the majority of her playing time coming as a first baseman and designated hitter.  She posted a batting average of .500 throughout the competition alongside nine RBIs, leading to her being named to the tournament all-star team as first baseman and winning the national team's Most Valuable Player (MVP) award.  Asay went on to compete in six more editions of the World Cup, helping the Canadian team earn silver in 2008 and 2016, and bronze in 2012 and 2018.  During the 2016 tournament, she played as starting pitcher and won her two starts by pitching complete games.  This included a 2–1 victory over Chinese Taipei in the semifinals.  She posted a 1.00 earned run average (ERA) and 16 strikeouts.  Offensively, she had a .333 batting average with two doubles and three RBIs.  In recognition of her performance, she was honoured as the team MVP for the second time.

In May 2015, Asay was one of eighteen players chosen to play for the Canadian roster at the 2015 Pan American Games, held two months later in Toronto.  It was the first edition of a major multi-sport Games to feature women's baseball.  She was selected as both a first baseman and pitcher.  The team ultimately advanced to the gold medal match of the women's tournament, losing 11–3 against the United States.  She pitched  innings in relief and recorded an RBI in the final.  Asay was later ranked seventh in Baseball America top 10 list of best female baseball players in the world released in August 2017.  She was the only Canadian to make the list.  At the time of her death, she was the longest-serving member of the Canadian women's baseball team, having played on the squad for sixteen years.

Ice hockey
Asay competed in women's ice hockey with the UBC Thunderbirds from 2010 to 2012, playing as a forward.  During the 2010–11 Thunderbirds season, she scored 6 goals and contributed 5 assists for 11 points.  In her final year, she was second on the team in points scored with four games remaining.  She scored UBC's only two goals in a 4–2 loss to the Manitoba Bisons on Seniors Night, when Asay and another senior-year teammate were honoured before their final home game with the Thunderbirds.  She scored another goal during the penultimate game of the Canada West regular season against the Saskatchewan Huskies.

Personal life
Asay appeared alongside her supervisor Suzanne Simard in the documentary film Intelligent Trees.  She was employed as a forester for the Ministry of Forests, Lands, Natural Resources and Rural Development in Nelson, British Columbia.  She played hockey there in the winter of 2021–22.

Asay died at the age of 33 on January 7, 2022, at Kootenay Lake Hospital in Nelson. She fell into a tree well while skiing at the nearby Whitewater Ski Resort.  Two months after her death, the Prince George Community Foundation created the Dr. Amanda Asay Memorial Award in her honour. It is presented annually to two post-secondary school students, one from School District 57 in her hometown and the other from School District 8 in Nelson.

Career stats

NCAA hockey

Source:

Awards and honours
 IBAF Women's World Cup of Baseball All-Tournament Team (2006)
 Finalist, Tip O'Neill Award (2006, 2016)
 Canadian Women's MVP (2006, 2016)

References

1988 births
2022 deaths
Baseball people from British Columbia
Baseball players at the 2015 Pan American Games
Brown Bears softball players
Brown Bears women's ice hockey players
Canadian female baseball players
Medalists at the 2015 Pan American Games
Pan American Games medalists in baseball
Pan American Games silver medalists for Canada
Skiing deaths
UBC Thunderbirds ice hockey players
University of British Columbia alumni
Accidental deaths in British Columbia
Sport deaths in Canada
20th-century Canadian women
21st-century Canadian women